Salemsborg is an unincorporated community in Saline County, Kansas, United States.  It is located about 10 miles south-southwest of Salina at the intersection of Burma Road and Salemsborg Road.

Demographics
As a part of Saline County, Salemsborg is a part of the Salina micropolitan area.

Education
The community is served by Smoky Valley USD 400 public school district.

See also
 List of Nike missile locations - 2 miles south of Salemsborg

References

Further reading

External links
 Saline County maps: Current, Historic, KDOT

Unincorporated communities in Saline County, Kansas
Salina, Kansas micropolitan area
Unincorporated communities in Kansas